When a Girl Loves is a 1919 American silent Western film directed by Phillips Smalley and Lois Weber and starring Mildred Harris, William Stowell and Wharton Jones.

Cast
 Mildred Harris as Bess
 William Stowell as 'Eagle' Ryan
 Wharton Jones as The Minister
 Alfred Paget as Ben Grant
 Willis Marks as William Wiatt

References

Bibliography
 Karen Ward Mahar, Women Filmmakers in Early Hollywood. JHU Press, 2008.

External links
 

1919 films
1919 Western (genre) films
American black-and-white films
Films directed by Phillips Smalley
Films directed by Lois Weber
Universal Pictures films
Silent American Western (genre) films
1910s English-language films
1910s American films